Nicolás Giovagnoli (born 15 May 1998) is an Argentine professional footballer who plays as a forward for Comunicaciones.

Career
Giovagnoli started his career with Comunicaciones. His senior breakthrough arrived during the 2016–17 Primera B Metropolitana season as he made appearances off the bench against Atlanta and Estudiantes. Giovagnoli made his first start in 2017–18 against Sacachispas on 14 October 2017, scoring his first goal in the process at the Estadio Alfredo Ramos; the forward appeared fifteen times in total that season.

Career statistics
.

References

External links

1998 births
Living people
Place of birth missing (living people)
Argentine footballers
Association football forwards
Primera B Metropolitana players
Club Comunicaciones footballers